Donald Pridemore (born October 20, 1946) is a Wisconsin electrical engineer and politician.

Early life 
Pridemore was born in Milwaukee, Wisconsin, and graduated from Milwaukee Lutheran High School in 1964. From 1965 to 1969 he served in the U.S. Air Force. In 1977, he received a Bachelor of Science degree in electrical engineering from Marquette University. Before entering politics, Pridemore worked in electrical engineering.

Political career
Pridemore was elected to the Wisconsin State Assembly in 2004, and won re-election four more times.

Wisconsin State Assembly

2010 Primary
In 2010, Pridemore faced a three-way primary for the 99th District from Hartford Mayor Scott Henke and former Sussex Village Trustee Jim Batzko. With endorsements from the National Rifle Association and a 100% rating from Wisconsin Right to Life,  Pridemore won with 58% of the vote.

2012 Primary
Redistricting moved Pridemore to the 22nd District. Hartford was no longer in his district, but most of Menomonee Falls and parts of Milwaukee were. In 2012, Nick Oliver challenged Pridemore for the Republican nomination for the 22nd Assembly District. With endorsements from the Menomonee Falls Taxpayer Association, Mark Belling, and Governor Scott Walker, Pridemore defeated Oliver 83% to 17%.

Pridemore was unopposed in the general election after a review by the Wisconsin Government Accountability Board found that Democratic challenger Chad Bucholtz was 13 signatures short of the 200 needed to be on the ballot.

2014
On April 9, 2014, Pridemore announced that he was retiring from the Wisconsin Assembly.

Healthcare whistleblowers
Pridemore has sponsored legislation to protect whistleblowers in the health care industry. His bill was supported by the Milwaukee Journal Sentinel.

Election reform
Pridemore has introduced legislation to require photo identification in Wisconsin elections. Special registration deputies would also be required to have a criminal background check. His bill would also move the party primaries from September to August so as not to conflict with a federal law intended to give military and overseas voters enough time to vote.

Nonmarital parenthood and child abuse

In 2012, Pridemore cosponsored a bill that recognized "nonmarital parenthood as a contributing factor to child abuse and neglect". He commented that in some situations there may be other options than divorce, stating "If they can refind those reasons and get back to why they got married in the first place it might help." Politifact rated as "True" the bill author's claim that children in a nonmarital parenthood setting "have a 20 times greater chance of being sexually abused."

Dog breeders
In 2011, Pridemore sponsored legislation that would redefine "commercial breeder" to protect hobby breeders and rescues from restrictions targeting large scale 'puppy mills.' The previous restrictions had been implemented by former Governor Jim Doyle in an effort to prevent 'puppy mills' where dogs live in abusive and neglectful conditions The Dog Federation of Wisconsin argued that the previous restrictions were negatively impacting "rescue groups and smaller humane societies". The previous restrictions were resulting in increased "dumping" of dogs in rural counties.

Superintendent of Public Instruction
In December 2012, Pridemore announced he would be running for the Wisconsin Superintendent of Public Instruction office in the Wisconsin April 2013 Election. In the April 2013 Wisconsin election, Pridemore was defeated by Tony Evers.

Wisconsin State Senate

2021 special election
Pridemore is a candidate for the 13th State Senate district in the 2021 special election. Pridemore's residence was challenged but ultimately the challenge was unsuccessful and Pridemore will remain on the ballot.

Controversy
In 2009, the Democratic Party of Wisconsin filed a complaint with the Government Accountability Board alleging that Pridemore's criticism of a candidate for Superintendent of Public Instruction in a press release issued on his state letterhead violated state law.

Notes

External links
Ballotpedia page
Official Campaign Blog

Republican Party members of the Wisconsin State Assembly
Living people
1946 births
Politicians from Milwaukee
People from Hartford, Wisconsin
Marquette University alumni
Military personnel from Milwaukee
United States Air Force airmen
21st-century American politicians
American electrical engineers
Candidates in the 2021 United States elections